Konyár is a village in Hajdú-Bihar county, in the Northern Great Plain region of eastern Hungary.

Etymology
The names comes from the Slavic koňar/koniar (a stableman or a horsekeeper). 1213/1150 Kanar.

Geography

Notable residents
 Péter Perjés (1968-), singer-songwriter, musician, and musicals director
 Alfred Tibor (1920 – 2017), sculptor

References

Populated places in Hajdú-Bihar County